Rue du Bac is a station on Line 12 of the Paris Métro in the 7th arrondissement.

The station opened on 5 November 1910 as part of the original section of the Nord-Sud Company's line A between Porte de Versailles and Notre-Dame-de-Lorette. On 27 March 1931 line A became line 12 of the Métro.  It is named after the Rue du Bac, a street leading to a ferry (bac) across the Seine used in 1564 during the construction of the Tuileries Palace.

Nearby are the Hôtel Matignon (the official residence of the Prime Minister of France) and the Maison de Verre (a house built between 1928 and 1932 in an early modern style).

Station layout

Gallery

References
Roland, Gérard (2003). Stations de métro. D’Abbesses à Wagram. Éditions Bonneton.

Paris Métro stations in the 7th arrondissement of Paris
Railway stations in France opened in 1910